Ricardo Moyán is a Spanish actor

He appeared in La caza del oro (1972), and Dallas (1974), both directed by Joan Bosch; and A Noose Is Waiting for You Trinity (1972), directed by Alfonso Balcázar,

Filmography

References

External links
 

Date of birth missing
20th-century Spanish male actors
Spanish male film actors